Kathleen Appler D.C (died 18 March 2020) was an American Roman Catholic nun, became one of the first seven women appointed members of the Congregation for Institutes of Consecrated Life and Societies of Apostolic Life the second highest-ranking department of the Roman Curia, the administrative institution of the Holy See on 8 July 2019, when she was appointed by Pope Francis.

From 25 May 2015 until her death on 18 March 2020, she was the Superioress General of the Daughters of Charity of Saint Vincent de Paul and since 2009 is member of its General Assembly.

Sister Kathleen Appler died in Paris on 18 March 2020, after a long illness. Françoise Petit on 20 April 2020 was elected the new Superior General of the Daughters of Charity.

References 

2020 deaths
20th-century American Roman Catholic nuns
Women officials of the Roman Curia
Superiors general
Daughters and Sisters of Charity of St. Vincent de Paul
Members of the Congregation for Institutes of Consecrated Life and Societies of Apostolic Life
Year of birth missing
21st-century American Roman Catholic nuns